Brengle is a surname. Notable people with the surname include:

Francis Brengle (1807–1846), American politician
Madison Brengle (born 1990), American tennis player
Samuel Logan Brengle (1860–1936), American Salvationist

See also
Brendle